The 2014–15 Copa Federación de España was the 22nd edition of the Copa Federación de España, also known as Copa RFEF, a knockout competition for Spanish football clubs in Segunda División B and Tercera División. R. Unión defeated Castellón 4–0 on aggregate in the final. R. Unión got the trophy and a cash prize of 90.152 euros and qualified for the next edition of the tournament. Castellón received a prize of 30.051 euros and losing semifinalists 12.020 euros. Each winner of an Autonomous Community tournament received a prize of 3.005 euros.

The competition began 30 July 2014 and finished 16 April 2015.

Autonomous Communities tournaments

West Andalusia and Ceuta tournament

Semifinals

Final

East Andalusia and Melilla tournament

Semifinals

Final

Aragon tournament

Quarter-finals

Semifinals

Final

Asturias tournament

Qualifying tournament

Group A

Group B

Group C

Group D

Semifinals

Final

Neutral venue

Balearic Islands tournament

First round

Mercadal and Formentera received a bye.

Semifinals

Final

Basque Country tournament

First round

Berio received a bye

Semifinals

Final

Canary Islands tournament

Semifinals

Final

Cantabria tournament

Quarter-finals

All matches in Castillo Siete Villas.

Semifinals

All matches in Castillo Siete Villas.

Final

Neutral venue

Castile and León tournament

Castile-La Mancha tournament

Semifinals

Final

Catalonia tournament

Semifinals

Final

Extremadura tournament

First round

At. San José received a bye.

Second round

Arroyo received a bye.

Semifinal

Plasencia received a bye.

Final

Neutral venue

Galicia tournament

First round

Alondras, Barbadás, Boiro, Cerceda, Pontevedra and Rápido de Bouzas received a bye.

Second round

Semifinals

Final

Neutral venue

La Rioja tournament

Semifinals

Final

Madrid tournament

Final

Murcia tournament

First round

Cartagena FC qualified because Pinatar fielded an ineligible player.

Semifinals

Final

Neutral venue

Navarre tournament

Qualifying tournament
Group A

Group B

Group C

Group D

Semifinals

Final

Valencian Community tournament

First round

Elche Ilicitano and Ontinyent received a bye.

Semifinals

Final

National phase
National phase will begin in November 2014. CD Ourense will not defend the title after being dissolved in July 2014.

Qualified teams

Teams losing Copa del Rey first round
 Gimnástica
 Marino
 Sestao (Renounces to play)
 Amorebieta
 Varea
 At. Astorga
 Trival Valderas
 Puertollano
 Toledo
 At. Baleares
 Peña Deportiva (Renounces to play)
 Hércules (Renounces to play)
 FC Cartagena (Renounces to play)
 La Hoya Lorca (Renounces to play)
 San Roque de Lepe
 Marbella
 R. Jaén (Renounces to play)
 At. Granadilla

Winners of Autonomous Communities tournaments
 Haro
 Tropezón
 Almudévar
 Osasuna B
 Móstoles
 Conquense
 Mercadal
 Arroyo
 Castellón
 Arandina
 Linares
 Gerena
 Sporting B
 Unión Viera
 Prat
 Boiro
 Cartagena FC
 R. Unión

Round of 32
The draw for the first round was held on November 3. Round of 32 was played between 27 November and 18 December 2014.

 Gerena (4) and  Unión Viera (4) received a bye.

First leg

Second leg

At. Astorga won 3–1 on aggregate

Boiro won 4–4 on away goals rule

R. Unión won 3–1 on aggregate

Tropezón won 3–1 on aggregate

Osasuna B won 8–0 on aggregate

Arandina won 3–1 on aggregate

Almudévar won 3–1 on aggregate

At. Baleares won 7–3 on aggregate

Castellón won 2–1 on aggregate

Conquense won 5–0 on aggregate

Linares won 3–1 on aggregate after extra time

Marbella won 3–2 on aggregate

Móstoles won 5–3 on aggregate

Round of 16
The draw for the round of 16 was held on December 19. Round of 16 was played between 7 and 22 January 2015.

First leg

Second leg

Arandina won 2–2 on away goals rule

Castellón won 3–1 on aggregate

R. Unión won 6–1 on aggregate

Gerena won 1–1 on aggregate after extra time and penalty kicks

Linares won 6–2 on aggregate

Conquense won 3–2 on aggregate

At. Baleares won 2–2 on aggregate on away goals rule

Quarter-finals
The draw for the quarter-finals was held 23 January 2015. Quarter-finals were played between 4 and 19 February 2015.

First leg

Postponed 4 February by snow. 

Postponed 5 February by bad pitch conditions.

Second leg

Castellón won 4–3 on aggregate

Linares won 3–0 on aggregate

R. Unión won 5–4 on aggregate after extra time

Tropezón won 5–3 on aggregate

Semi-finals
The draw for the semi-finals was held 13 February 2015. Semi-finals were played between 4 and 18 March 2015.

First leg

Second leg

Castellón won 2–1 on aggregate

Real Unión won 2–0 on aggregate

Final

Final was played between 9 and 16 April 2015.

First leg

Second leg

R. Unión won 4–0 on aggregate.

References

2014-15
3
2014–15 Segunda División B
2014–15 Tercera División